Sibtain Kassamali (24 March 1963 – 27 October 2018) was a Kenyan cricketer. He played in one first-class match for the Kenya cricket team in the 1986/87 season. Along with his first-class appearance, against a touring Pakistan side, Kassamali played in two editions of the ICC Trophy. Kassamali also worked as a selector for the Kenyan men's and women's national teams, and helped set up a cricket academy in the country.

References

External links
 

1963 births
2018 deaths
Kenyan cricketers
Place of birth missing